Samuel Pagán Cuadrado (born May 17, 1977) is a Puerto Rican politician affiliated with the New Progressive Party (PNP). He has been a member of the Puerto Rico House of Representatives since 2017 representing the 35th District.

Early years and studies
Born in 1977 in Humacao, Puerto Rico to Samuel Pagán Quintana and Ana Cuadrado. He obtained an associate degree in communications from the University of Puerto Rico at Humacao and a B.A. in elementary education from the University of Turabo graduating Magna-laude.

Professional career
He started his career as a real estate broker in 1997. A few years later decided to exercise his vocation as a teacher at Manuel Mediavilla Negrón vocational school in his native Humacao.

Political career
After winning a district primaries, he was nominated as a candidate for the Puerto Rico House of Representatives for the 35th District. On May 29, 2018, Samuel Pagán announced his resignation from the Puerto Rico House of Representatives.

Personal life
He is married to Nancy Malavé Toro and has two children.

References
http://www.tucamarapr.org/dnncamara/web/ComposiciondelaCamara/biografia.aspx?rep=207

Living people
1977 births
New Progressive Party members of the House of Representatives of Puerto Rico
New Progressive Party (Puerto Rico) politicians
People from Humacao, Puerto Rico